Mark Griffin may refer to:

Musicians 
Mark Griffin, American rapper and musician known professionally as MC 900 Ft. Jesus
Marc Griffin, American rapper and musician known professionally as Marc E. Bassy

Others
Mark Griffin (entrepreneur), billiards promoter and owner of CueSports International
Mark Griffin (politician) (born 1985), Scottish politician
Mark Griffin (spiritual teacher) (born 1954), American spiritual teacher
Mark Griffin (actor) (born 1968), British actor
Mark Griffin (rugby union) (born 1975), rugby union player
Marc Griffin (judge) (born 1956), American lawyer